The Show Must Go On is a 2007 South Korean action film written and directed by Han Jae-rim, starring Song Kang-ho in the lead role. The film revolves around a full-time gangster who's aspiring to be a full-time husband and dad.

The film released theatrically in South Korea on 5 April 2007.

Plot 
In-gu is a gangster but also a husband and father who dreams of moving his family out of their drab apartment and into a bigger home. Shunned by his daughter and nagged by his wife to get a respectable job, In-gu nonetheless perseveres down his chosen path to provide for his family. But his family life starts to get in the way of his business, and to make matters worse he is plotted against by the younger brother of his boss which favors In-gu for his abilities to enforce territorial rights.

Cast 
 Song Kang-ho ... In-gu
 Park Ji-young ... Mi-ryung
 Kim So-eun ... Hee-soo
 Oh Dal-su ... Hyun-soo
 Yoon Je-moon ... Director Noh
 Choi Il-hwa ... Chairman Noh 
 Choi Jong-ryul ... owner of dumpling restaurant
 Jung In-gi ... police chief
 Kim Kyeong-ik ... Hee-soo's teacher
 Kwon Tae-won ... police chief of police substation
 Lee Dae-yeon ... company president Baek
 Oh Jung-se ... manager
 Lydia Park ... female employee
 Lee Yong-yi ... granny in broken-down home
 Min Seong-wook ... Director Noh's subordinate
 Son Se-bin ... daughter of woman in mourning
 Park Jin-woo ... reporter
 Lee Jang-hoon ... Yong-seok

Release 
The film was released in South Korea on April 5, 2007, and received a total of 1,025,781 admissions nationwide.

Awards 
The Show Must Go On won Best Film and Best Actor for Song Kang-ho at the 28th Blue Dragon Film Awards in 2007.

References

External links 
 
 
 
 
 The Show Must Go On review at Koreanfilm.org

2007 films
2007 action drama films
2007 crime drama films
South Korean action drama films
South Korean crime drama films
South Korean gangster films
Films about organized crime in South Korea
Best Picture Blue Dragon Film Award winners
Lotte Entertainment films
2000s Korean-language films
Films directed by Han Jae-rim
2000s South Korean films